"Little Secrets" is a song by British pop singer Professor Green, featuring vocals from Dutch singer Mr. Probz. It was released on 7 December 2014 as the second and final single from Green's third studio album, Growing Up in Public (2014).

Controversy
The X Factor winner James Arthur accused Green of stealing his lyrics for the song, as he was due to feature on the track but got pulled following some bad publicity. A source close to Green claims that the song was written by Kid Harpoon and Professor Green before James and Professor Green met.

Track listing

Charts

References

2014 singles
2014 songs
Professor Green songs
Mr Probz songs
Songs written by Kid Harpoon
Songs written by Professor Green
Virgin Records singles
Songs involved in plagiarism controversies